Estadio Venustiano Carranza is a multi-use stadium in Morelia, Mexico, used mostly for football matches and also for athletics. It was initially used as the stadium of Monarcas Morelia matches.  It was replaced by Estadio Morelos when Monarcas Morelia moved there in 1989. In October 2021, H2O Purépechas F.C., a Liga TDP team, began to play there. The capacity of the stadium is 17,600 spectators.

References

External links
 Stadium history

Football venues in Mexico
Atlético Morelia
Sports venues in Michoacán